The following is an episode list for the Nickelodeon sitcom Unfabulous. The series aired from September 12, 2004 to December 16, 2007 with a total of 41 episodes and three seasons produced.

Series overview

Episodes

Season 1 (2004–05)

Season 2 (2005–06)

Season 3 (2007)
After being on hiatus for 10 months (due to Roberts filming Nancy Drew), one episode from the third and final season aired in the US on August 10, 2007. Miranda Cosgrove guest starred in the episode, titled "The Talent Show", as part of "Miranda Madness weekend". The third season first aired on Latin America on May 21, 2007, with an entire week of new episodes, it followed in the United Kingdom in July 2007 on Nickelodeon.

External links
 
 

Lists of American sitcom episodes
Lists of American children's television series episodes
Lists of Nickelodeon television series episodes